This is a list of men's national ice hockey teams in the world. Currently, just under 100 national ice hockey teams exist in some capacity, with teams representing UN member states as well as some dependent territories, sub-national entities and states who are not members of the United Nations.

Current national ice hockey teams
This section lists the current:
 83 men's national ice hockey teams who are members of the International Ice Hockey Federation, including 60 full members, 22 associate members and one affiliate member.
 4 non-IIHF countries with active national ice hockey teams.

IIHF Full Members
IIHF Full Members are nations that have their own independent ice hockey association and regularly participate in IIHF-sanctioned World Championships. Teams are ranked based on their results over the previous four years in the IIHF World Ranking.

♣
 Azerbaijan*
1

♣

♣
♣

♠♣
♣

♣

♣

2

3

♣

♣

♣

1

♣
♣

♣
♣

♣

The current holder of the 2022 IIHF World Championship is marked by ♠.
The current participants for the 2023 IIHF World Championship Top Division are marked by ♣.
1. Russia and Belarus were suspended by the IIHF on 28 February 2022 due to their invasion of Ukraine.
2. India has only participated in the IIHF Asia and Oceania Championship, but has not entered any World Championships.
3. Ireland has participated in the World Championship in the past, but is currently not active.
* Nation is a member of the IIHF, but does not have a national ice hockey team.

IIHF Associate and Affiliate Members
IIHF Associate Members either do not have an independent ice hockey association in their country, or do not meet minimum standards for participation  in the IIHF World Championships. Teams in this category generally compete in events outside the World Championship structure; such as the IIHF Development Cup, IIHF Asia and Oceania Championship, Asian Winter Games, or Amerigol LATAM Cup.

Chile is an IIHF Affiliate Member, a special category for nations that participated in the now-defunct IIHF Inline Hockey World Championship.

2

 (affiliate member)

2
1

 Moldova*

 Nepal*

3

1. Indonesia will make its World Championship debut in 2023.
2. Armenia and Greece have participated in the World Championship in the past, but are currently not active.
3. Tunisia has a national ice hockey team, but has not not yet played an international match.
* Nation is a member of the IIHF, but does not have a national ice hockey team.

Non-IIHF Members
The following countries are not members of the IIHF, but have national ice hockey teams that have played at least one international match.

Former national ice hockey teams
The following national teams have ceased to exist through the years.

 Bohemia

 ( Unified Team)

 East Germany
 West Germany
 Protectorate of Bohemia and Moravia

Multinational teams
Exhibition teams representing multiple countries in Europe and North America have participated in the 2016 World Cup of Hockey.

 Europe
 North America

See also
Ice hockey by country
List of ice hockey leagues
List of members of the International Ice Hockey Federation

References

External links
International Ice Hockey Federation

 
National ice hockey teams